Nationality words link to articles with information on the nation's poetry or literature (for instance, Irish or France).

Events
 During this year's harvest, 15-year-old Scottish farm labourer Robert Burns is assisted by his contemporary Nelly Kilpatrick who inspires his first attempt at poetry, "O, Once I Lov'd A Bonnie Lass".
 Jacques Delille elected to membership in the Académie Française in large part due to his verse translation of the Georgics in 1769

Works published

Colonial America
 Hugh Henry Brackenridge, "A Poem on Divine Revelation"
 Samuel Occom, editor, A Choice Collection of Hymns and Spiritual Songs
 John Trumbull, "An Elegy on the Times"

United Kingdom
 James Beattie, The Minstrel; or, The Progress of Genius, Book 2 (Book 1 1771, both books published together with other verse in 1775)
 William Dunkin, The Poetical Works of the Late William Dunkin, posthumously published; Volume 1 includes Latin and Ancient Greek poetry with English translations
 Oliver Goldsmith, Retaliation; a poem, published April 19
 Richard Graves, The Progress of Gallantry, published anonymously
 Thomas Gray, The Poems of Mr Gray (posthumous)
 William Mason, An Heroic Postscript to the Public, published anonymously
 Hannah More, The Inflexible Captive: A tragedy
 Samuel Jackson Pratt (as "Courtney Melmoth"), The Tears of A Genius, occasioned by the Death of Dr Goldsmith
 Henry James Pye, Farringdon Hill
 Mary Scott, The Female Advocate, a response to The Feminead 1754 by John Duncombe
 Thomas Warton the Younger, History of English Poetry, in three volumes, published from 1774-1781
 William Whitehead, Plays and Poems by William Whitehead, Esq. Poet Laureat (see also Poems 1788)

Other
 Charles Batteux, Principes de la littérature, including Cours de belles lettres of 1765; criticism; France

Births

Death years link to the corresponding "[year] in poetry" article:
 June 3 – Robert Tannahill (died 1810), Scottish "Weaver Poet"
 August 12 – Robert Southey (died 1843), English poet
 November 4 – Robert Allan (died 1841), Scottish "Weaver Poet"

Deaths
Birth years link to the corresponding "[year] in poetry" article:
 Early – Lady Dorothea Du Bois (born 1728), Irish poet and writer
 c. January 29–February 5 – James Love, pseudonym of James Dance (born 1721), English poet, playwright and actor
 May 11 – Charles Jenner (born 1736), English poet, novelist and Anglican cleric
 August 14 – Johann Jakob Reiske (born 1716), German scholar and physician
 October 16 – Oliver Goldsmith (born 1728), English writer and poet
 October 17 – Robert Fergusson (born 1750), Scottish poet
 November 25 – Henry Baker (born 1698), English naturalist, poet, sign-language developer
 December 20 – Paul Whitehead (born 1710), English satiric poet
 Khwaja Muhammad Zaman (born 1713), Indian, Sindhi-language poet

See also

 List of years in poetry
 List of years in literature
 18th century in poetry
 18th century in literature
 French literature of the 18th century
 Sturm und Drang (the conventional translation is "Storm and Stress"; a more literal translation, however, might be "storm and urge", "storm and longing", "storm and drive" or "storm and impulse"), a movement in German literature (including poetry) and music from the late 1760s through the early 1780s
 List of years in poetry
 Poetry

Notes

18th-century poetry
Poetry